Al-Rayah al-Wasta is a sub-district located in Iyal Surayh District, 'Amran Governorate, Yemen. Al-Rayah al-Wasta had a population of 17653 according to the 2004 census.

References 

Sub-districts in Iyal Surayh District